5′-Deoxy-5′-fluoroadenosine is the first step in the biosynthesis of organic fluorides. It is synthesized by the fluorinase catalyzed addition of a fluoride ion to S-adenosyl-L-methionine, releasing L-methionine as a by product. Purine nucleoside phosphorylase mediates a phosphorolytic cleavage of the adenine base to generate 5-fluoro-5-deoxy-D-ribose-1-phosphate.

References

Organofluorides
Nucleosides
Fluorine-containing natural products